David Louis Sneddon (born May 3, 1980; disappeared August 14, 2004), is an American university student who disappeared in Yunnan Province, China after traveling alone through Tiger Leaping Gorge. Over 12 years later, on August 31, 2016, the Abductee's Family Union of South Korea claimed that it had gathered intelligence demonstrating Sneddon had been abducted by North Korean agents and taken to North Korea where he became the personal English language tutor to Kim Jong-un.

Aftermath of disappearance
The official position of the Chinese Government is that Sneddon died after falling into the  Jinsha River, which passes through Tiger Leaping Gorge, although no body has ever been recovered. The United States eventually adopted the Chinese Government's position. However, after discovery of compelling evidence that Sneddon was abducted by the North Korean regime, the U.S. House of Representatives unanimously voted on September 28, 2016, to direct the U.S. State Department and all other intelligence agencies to reopen the investigations into Sneddon's whereabouts. The U.S. Senate passed a similar resolution by unanimous vote more than two years later on November 29, 2018. North Korea denies its involvement in Sneddon's disappearance.

See also
 List of people who disappeared

References

External links
 Help Find David Sneddon

1980 births
2000s missing person cases
China–United States relations
Missing person cases in China
North Korean abductions
North Korea–United States relations
Living people